Ogopa Deejays are a Kenyan music production team and record label formed in the late 1990s who gained regional fame and popularity due to standards of their production work.

Background 

The people behind Ogopa DJs are brothers Francis and Lucas Bikedo, and manager Banda. They rarely show their faces in public and do not agree to have their photos taken or published by Kenyan media.

The team started out producing hit songs for artists such as Bebe Cool, Chameleone and Redsan. They are widely acclaimed to have helped boost the Kenyan urban music scene from obscurity. They are also credited with creating the Boomba (sometimes referred to as Kapuka) style of Kenyan music which is modern hip hop and dancehall influenced by African drums and rhythms. They later formed Ogopa Productions which apart from music production also organizes events. They revolutionised Kenyan music in the early 2000s.

They have released three compilation albums and several albums by their artists. Their first album was released in 2001 and was widely popular in East Africa. It also introduced fans to the talent of the late E-Sir and K-Rupt. They are famous for their logo of a red face screaming.

A music producer from Virginia, United States, gave the group a chance to showcase their musical talent in 2003. Tickets sold out about three hours, a record time for this group. Ultimately the show was a huge success and the group planned to start a world tour in 2013.

Their studios are located in South B estate of Nairobi. They have also started a sister label operating in Namibia and South Africa, known as Ogopa Butterfly. They have produced for Namibian, Windhoek based girl duo, Gal Level, and Kenyan-Namibian musician Faizel MC.

In 2018, Ogopa Deejays and Calif Records co-hosted the Ngoma Festival at Uhuru Gardens.

List of signed artists
Artists who have been signed to Ogopa Deejays label for at least part of their career (artists who have occasionally recorded with Ogopa are excluded) include:

Current artists
Alpha
Amani
Colonel Mustafa
Marya
Kenzo
Silas
Trapee
Gal Level
Boomba Boiz
Rapper willyjay
Hearts Prince Brown Jr (EsirEaly)

Former artists
Avril
Bebe Cool
Big Pin
Chameleone
Nameless
Deux Vultures
E-Sir
Kleptomaniax
K-rupt
Longombas
Mr. Googz & Vinnie Banton
Mr. Lenny & Kunguru
Redsan
Tattuu
Wahu

See also
 List of record labels

References

External links 
Ogopa Deejays official website
Ogopa Butterfly

Kenyan record labels
Hip hop record labels